Lanka Business Online (also commonly shortened LBO) is an online business news publisher based in Colombo, Sri Lanka. Founded in 1998, it is currently one of the most popular English-language online business news website in Sri Lanka. The website was founded by Lakshaman Bandaranayake, and is currently owned by Lanka Business Online (Private) Limited.

See also 
 Daily FT

References

External links 
 

Sri Lankan news websites
Publications established in 1998